Stefanie Daffara (born 13 June 1995) is an Australian cricketer. She plays for the Hobart Hurricanes in the Women's Big Bash League and for the Tasmanian Tigers in the Women's National Cricket League.

References

External links

1995 births
Living people
Hobart Hurricanes (WBBL) cricketers
Tasmanian Tigers (women's cricket) cricketers
Sydney Thunder (WBBL) cricketers